Based on a True Story is the fifth studio album by American rapper Silkk the Shocker,  released on September 7, 2004, on The New No Limit Records and Koch Records. It was produced by Myke Diesel, Donald XL Robertson and former Flipmode Squad member Serious Chart-wise, Based on a True Story is thus far the lowest charting album of Silkk's careerpad debuting at  number 88 on the Billboard 200,  number 20 on the Top R&B/Hip-Hop Albums and  number 7 on the Independent Albums.

Track listing

Charts

References

Silkk the Shocker albums
2004 albums
No Limit Records albums